George Albert "Chick" Guarnieri (July 1, 1899 – April 1980) was a professional football player who played 2 seasons in the National Football League, with the Canton Bulldogs and the Buffalo Bisons. He played during the 1924 and 1925 season.

Notes

1899 births
1980 deaths
Sportspeople from Ashtabula, Ohio
Players of American football from Ohio
Buffalo Bisons (NFL) players
Canton Bulldogs players
Notre Dame Fighting Irish football players